Dany Engobo is a Congolese musician and leader of Les Coeurs Brises. He started his music career in Brazzaville. He worked with a guitar maestro Diblo Dibala in most of his songs. He moved to Paris in 1976 and learned French there. From then on he started singing his songs in that language. For international purposes, his songs are mostly done in Lingala Language and French.
He is also one of the richest. 

He is well known for an impressive front line of beautiful dancing queens selected from a number of different countries.

Sources

Living people
1955 births
Republic of the Congo musicians
Republic of the Congo expatriates in France